At the 1968 Summer Olympics in Mexico City, eight events in fencing were contested. Men competed in both individual and team events for each of the three weapon types (épée, foil and sabre), but women competed only in foil events.

Medal summary

Men's events

Women's events

Medal table

Participating nations
A total of 275 fencers (217 men and 58 women) from 34 nations competed at the Mexico City Games:

References

Sources
 

 
1968 Summer Olympics events
1968
1968 in fencing
International fencing competitions hosted by Mexico